Chris Yarangga (born 21 February 1973)  is an Indonesian football midfielder who played for Indonesia in the 1996 Asian Cup. He also played for Persipura Jayapura.

References

1973 births
Living people
Association football midfielders
Indonesian footballers
Papuan sportspeople
Indonesia international footballers
Persipura Jayapura players
Indonesian Premier Division players
Place of birth missing (living people)